Watermead may refer to the following places in England:
Watermead, Buckinghamshire
Watermead, Gloucestershire, a location
Watermead Country Park, Leicestershire